Breanna Hargrave (born 9 February 1982) is an Australian track cyclist.

Hargrave moved from athletics to track cycling at 28 years old as part of a ‘talent transfer’ program at the South Australian Sports Institute. She runs a physiotherapy practice in Norwood, South Australia. She won two bronze medals with Brandie O’Connor in the tandem events at the 2014 Commonwealth Games. She is also a five time Australian Champion and a 20 time National Championship Medallist and a 6 time Oceania Championship Medallist. Hargrave was selected to represent Australia aged 39 at the 2022 Commonwealth Games to compete against athletes half her age after Hargrave broke an eight-year-old Aussie record set by Anna Meares for the 500-metre time trial at the Adelaide SuperDrome.

References

External links
 
 

1983 births
Living people
Australian female cyclists
Australian track cyclists
21st-century Australian women
Cyclists at the 2022 Commonwealth Games
Commonwealth Games bronze medallists for Australia
Commonwealth Games medallists in cycling
Cyclists at the 2014 Commonwealth Games
Medallists at the 2014 Commonwealth Games